Keteleeria is a genus of three species of coniferous trees in the family Pinaceae first described as a genus in 1866.

The genus name Keteleeria honours J.B. Keteleer (1813–1903), a French nurseryman. The group is related to the genera Nothotsuga and Pseudolarix. It is distinguished from Nothotsuga by the much larger cones, and from Pseudolarix by the evergreen leaves and the cones not disintegrating readily at maturity. All three genera share the unusual feature of male cones produced in umbels of several together from a single bud, and also in their ability, very rare in the Pinaceae, of being able to coppice.

The genus is found in southern China (from Shaanxi south to Guangdong and Yunnan), Hainan, Taiwan, northern Laos, and Vietnam.

The variability of the cones has led in the past to the description of several additional species (up to 16 'species' have been named), but most authorities now only accept three species. Flora of China, however, recognized five.

The World Checklist maintained by Kew Botanical Garden accepts the following:

Species
Keteleeria davidiana (C.E.Bertrand) Beissn. — central and southern China, Taiwan
Keteleeria evelyniana Mast. — Sichuan, Yunnan, N Laos, Vietnam
Keteleeria fortunei (A.Murray) Carrière — southern China
†Keteleeria heterophylloides
formerly included
moved to Abies 
Keteleeria fabri =Abies fabri — Sichuan

Fossil record
Fossil pollen of Keteleeria caucasica have been recovered from strata of the Late Miocene in Georgia in the Caucasus region. Keteleeria sp. fossils are also known from the early Pleistocene of southern Portugal.

References

External links

Arboretum de Villardebelle - photos of cones
Gymnosperm Database

Pinaceae
Conifer genera
Taxa named by Élie-Abel Carrière